Mushid is:

the throne of an Indian princely state if occupied by a Muslim dynasty (the Hindu equivalent is gadhi 'cushion')
an African first name, as borne by some Rulers of Ruund (Luunda)